Heliades is a genus of moths of the family Pyralidae.

Species
Heliades huachucalis Haimbach, 1915
Heliades lindae Cashatt in Solis, Cashatt & Scholtens, 2012
Heliades mulleolella (Hulst, 1887)

References

Chrysauginae
Pyralidae genera
Taxa named by Émile Louis Ragonot